The UK Rock & Metal Singles Chart is a record chart which ranks the best-selling rock and heavy metal songs in the United Kingdom. Compiled and published by the Official Charts Company, the data is based on each track's weekly physical sales, digital downloads and streams. In 1994, only two charts were published, both with "Always" by Bon Jovi at number one. The third published chart of the year covers the period between 23 October 1994 and 21 January 1995, and lists Van Halen's "Don't Tell Me (What Love Can Do)" as number one for the entire period.

Chart history

See also
1994 in British music
List of UK Rock & Metal Albums Chart number ones of 1994

References

External links
Official UK Rock & Metal Singles Chart Top 40 at the Official Charts Company
The Official UK Top 40 Rock Singles at BBC Radio 1

1994 in British music
UK Rock and Metal Singles
Rock 1994